The Night of the Fog is a 1930 mystery detective novel by Anthony Gilbert, the pen name of British writer Lucy Beatrice Malleson.  It is the fifth of ten novels in a series featuring her amateur detective and politician Scott Egerton, a precursor to her better known creation Arthur Crook.

Synopsis
Egerton joins forces with an ex-secret service agent to assist the wealthy Jasper Hilton who has been threatened by a serious of anonymous letters. Shortly after they have appeared to solve the case, however, Hilton is murdered.

References

Bibliography
 Magill, Frank Northen . Critical Survey of Mystery and Detective Fiction: Authors, Volume 2. Salem Press, 1988.
Murphy, Bruce F. The Encyclopedia of Murder and Mystery. Springer, 1999.
 Reilly, John M. Twentieth Century Crime & Mystery Writers. Springer, 2015.

1930 British novels
British mystery novels
British thriller novels
Novels by Anthony Gilbert
Novels set in England
British detective novels
Victor Gollancz Ltd books
Dodd, Mead & Co. books